Joseph William Windmill MC, DCM (8 June 1881 – 29 October 1927) was an English footballer who played as a left half for Halesowen Town and Aston Villa.

Early life and footballing career
Windmill was born and educated in the Black Country. Having been born in Brierley Hill he attended Moor Street Council School in the same town. He played initially for Halesowen Town before joining Aston Villa in 1903 and making his debut on 7 November 1903 in a 3–1 home win against Newcastle United. This was his only appearance of the 1903–04 season and he would have to wait until 22 October 1904 for his next game. This marked the start of regular league appearances for Windmill and of a successful FA Cup run which saw Aston Villa beat Newcastle United in the 1905 FA Cup Final, on 15 April 1905, with Windmill gaining a winner's medal. In the 1905–06 season his opportunities to play were less and he turned-out in only 16 games. In the following three seasons, however, he made only a single appearance in the league in Aston Villa colours. Windmill, as with many footballers of the time, had employment away from football, in his case teaching. In 1910 the local education committee forced him to end his footballing career as they felt that it interfered with his teaching duties.

After football and World War I
Windmill saw active service in World War I in the Royal Warwickshire Regiment. He rose to the rank of Regimental Sergeant Major and gained the Military Cross and the Distinguished Conduct Medal for bravery. After the war he continued in the teaching profession and was appointed headmaster of Brook Street School, Wordsley in 1922. Windmill died at his Kingswinford home in 1927 aged 46.

Honours

 Aston Villa
 FA Cup: 1904–05

References

1881 births
1927 deaths
English footballers
English Football League players
Halesowen Town F.C. players
Aston Villa F.C. players
Royal Warwickshire Fusiliers officers
British Army personnel of World War I
Schoolteachers from the West Midlands
People from Brierley Hill
Recipients of the Military Cross
Recipients of the Distinguished Conduct Medal
Association football wing halves
Heads of schools in England
FA Cup Final players